The McDowall Ward is a Brisbane City Council ward covering McDowall, Everton Park and parts of Aspley, Bridgeman Downs, Chermside West, Stafford and Stafford Heights.

Councillors for McDowall Ward

Results

References 

City of Brisbane wards